This is a list of Superfund sites in South Carolina designated under the Comprehensive Environmental Response, Compensation, and Liability Act (CERCLA) environmental law.  The CERCLA federal law of 1980 authorized the United States Environmental Protection Agency (EPA) to create a list of polluted locations requiring a long-term response to clean up hazardous material contaminations.   These locations are known as Superfund sites, and are placed on the National Priorities List (NPL).  

The NPL guides the EPA in "determining which sites warrant further investigation" for environmental remediation.  As of March 10, 2011, there were 26 Superfund sites on the National Priorities List in South Carolina.  One additional site is currently proposed for entry on the list.  Four sites have been cleaned up and removed from the list.

Superfund sites

Superfund Alternative sites
Superfund Alternative sites are locations that have been found to be polluted enough to be listed on the National Priorities List, but are cleaned up through other methods without formal listing.  These are not "Superfund" sites since they do not go through the Superfund listing process.  There are 10 SA sites in South Carolina.

See also
List of Superfund sites in the United States
List of environmental issues
List of waste types
TOXMAP

References

External links
EPA list of current NPL Superfund sites in South Carolina
EPA list of proposed Superfund sites in South Carolina
EPA list of current Superfund sites in South Carolina
EPA list of Superfund site construction completions in South Carolina
EPA list of partially deleted Superfund sites in South Carolina
EPA list of deleted Superfund sites in South Carolina

South Carolina
Superfund
Superfund